Konstantin Romanovich Eiges (surname sometimes spelt Eyges, Russian Константин Романович Эйгес,  24 May (Old Style)/ 5 June 1875—2 Dec 1950) was a Russian composer, teacher and pianist.

Early life 
Eiges was born in Bogodukhov (now Bohodukhiv in Kharkiv oblast, Ukraine), to Jewish parents, the doctor Ruvim Manasiyevich (also known as Roman Mikhailovich)  Eiges (born Vilnius, 1840) and his wife Sofiya (Shifra) Iosifovna, née Eltsin. He was one of ten children, many of whom went on to artistic or academic careers; Vladimir Eiges (1877-1949) was a professor of mathematics, Aleksandr (1880-1943), also a mathematician, was an authority on Anton Chekhov, Veniamin (1888-1956) was an artist, Yekaterina (1890-1958) was a poet and sometime girlfriend of Sergei Esenin.

Career 
Eiges attended Moscow Conservatory between 1900 and 1905, where his teachers included  Mikhail Ippolitov-Ivanov (composition), Sergei Taneyev (counterpoint) and Adolf Yaroshevsky (piano). He was a colleague of Sergei Rachmaninoff and Nikolai Medtner. His pupils included  Alexei Stanchinsky. Most of his compositions are for piano solo, though he also wrote songs and chamber works, a cantata The Song of Oleg the Wise, and a symphonic poem, The Snowstorm. Eiges wrote numerous essays on music and philosophy, including essays on Richard Wagner and Alexander Skriabin.

Family 
Eiges was the father of the composer Oleg Eiges (1905-1992) and the artist Sergei Eiges (1910-1944).

References
Notes

Sources
Powell, Jonathan (2015). "The piano Music of Konstantin Romanovich Eiges." Booklet accompanying CD Konstantin Eiges: Piano Music, Toccata Classics, TOCC0215, pp. 2–11.
 Powell, Jonathan (n.d.). "Eiges [Eyges], Konstantin Romanovich", in Grove Music Online accessed 2 August 2015 .

1875 births
1950 deaths
19th-century classical composers
19th-century male musicians
20th-century classical composers
20th-century Russian male musicians
Composers for piano
Russian Jews
Jewish classical composers
Jewish classical pianists
Moscow Conservatory alumni
People from Bohodukhiv
Pupils of Sergei Taneyev
Russian classical pianists
Male classical pianists
Russian male classical composers
Russian music educators
Russian Romantic composers